The Navy Board is the body responsible for the day-to-day running of   His Majesty's Naval Service. Its composition is similar to that of the Admiralty Board of the Defence Council of the United Kingdom, except that it does not include any of His Majesty's Ministers. The Board shares a name with its historic predecessor, the Navy Board of 1546 to 1832, but is unrelated in structure or membership.

Membership of the Board

The composition is as follows:
Civilian
Chris Weston
Brian Gilvary
Lance Batchelor
Helen Miles
Auriol Stevens
Finance Director (Navy)
Royal Navy
First Sea Lord and Chief of Naval Staff
Second Sea Lord and Deputy Chief of Naval Staff 
Fleet Commander
Assistant Chief of the Naval Staff (Policy)

References

External links

 

Boards of the Royal Navy
1964 establishments in the United Kingdom